Ketut-Nesa Arta (born 16 February 1982), known as Nesa Arta, is an Indonesian former professional tennis player.

Arta, a native of Jakarta, competed at satellite/Futures level in tournaments around Asia and was a Davis Cup doubles player for Indonesia from 2008 to 2010. Partnering him in all five Davis Cup rubbers was Christopher Rungkat and the pair registered three wins. He and Rungkat also teamed up together to claim a doubles bronze medal at the 2009 Southeast Asian Games held in Laos.

ITF Futures titles

Doubles: (2)

See also
List of Indonesia Davis Cup team representatives

References

External links
 
 
 

1982 births
Living people
Indonesian male tennis players
Sportspeople from Jakarta
Competitors at the 2009 Southeast Asian Games
Southeast Asian Games medalists in tennis
Southeast Asian Games bronze medalists for Indonesia